Nationale 1 Dames, officially named the Total League - Dames for sponsorship reasons, is the highest women's  basketball league in Luxembourg. The league's governing body is Fédération Luxembourgeoise de Basketball (FLBB). Prior to the 2012–13 season, the league was known as the Diekirch League.

The current champions are Amicale who beat Musel Pikes in the 2017 finals.

Current clubs
The league currently consists of 10 teams.
Amicale
AB Contern
Musel-Pikes
T71 Dudelange
Etzella
Grengewald
Résidence
Basket Esch
Sparta
Telstar

Title holders 

 1946–47 Red Boys Differdange
 1947–48 BBC Bettembourg
 1948–49 Progrès Niedercorn
 1949–50 BBC Bettembourg
 1950–51 Melusina Steinsel
 1965–66 Racing Luxembourg
 1966–67 Racing Luxembourg
 1967–68 Racing Luxembourg
 1968–69 Racing Luxembourg
 1969–70 Amicale
 1970–71 Black Star Mersch
 1971–72 Black Star Mersch
 1972–73 Black Star Mersch
 1973–74 Amicale
 1974–75 Amicale
 1975–76 Black Star Mersch
 1976–77 Spora Luxembourg
 1977–78 Spora Luxembourg
 1978–79 Black Star Mersch
 1979–80 Spora Luxembourg
 1980–81 Les Espérants Wasserbillig
 1981–82 Black Star Mersch
 1982–83 Black Star Mersch
 1983–84 Sporting Luxembourg
 1984–85 Black Star Mersch
 1985–86 Sporting Luxembourg
 1986–87 Sporting Luxembourg
 1987–88 Sporting Luxembourg
 1988–89 Résidence
 1989–90 Sparta Bertrange
 1990–91 Etzella
 1991–92 Etzella
 1992–93 Résidence
 1993–94 Etzella
 1994–95 Etzella
 1995–96 Etzella
 1996–97 Etzella
 1997–98 Résidence
 1998–99 Résidence
 1999–00 Etzella
 2000–01 Résidence
 2001–02 Mess
 2002–03 T71 Dudelange
 2003–04 Contern
 2004–05 Musel Pikes
 2005–06 Basket Esch
 2006–07 Basket Esch
 2007–08 Basket Esch
 2008–09 T71 Dudelange
 2009–10 Musel Pikes
 2010–11 Musel Pikes
 2011–12 Basket Esch
 2012–13 Musel Pikes
 2013–14 Musel Pikes
 2014–15 Amicale
 2015–16 Amicale
 2016–17 Amicale

References

External links
Profile at eurobasket.com

Luxembourg
Basketball in Luxembourg